Shela Bagh Railway Station (Balochi:شیلاباغ ریلوے اسٹیشن) is located in Shela Bagh town, Qilla Abdullah district of Balochistan province of the Pakistan.

This railway station is gateway of the famous Khojak tunnel.

See also
 List of railway stations in Pakistan
 Pakistan Railways

References

Railway stations in Qila Abdullah District
Railway stations on Rohri–Chaman Railway Line